KGF or kgf may refer to:

Keratinocyte growth factor
King George's Fields, UK, recreation grounds 
Kolar Gold Fields
The IATA code for Sary-Arka Airport, Karaganda, Kazakhstan
 K.G.F (film series), Indian Kannada-language film series
K.G.F: Chapter 1, 2018 film
K.G.F: Chapter 2, 2022 film
Kilogram-force, abbreviated kgf